The Museo del Tesoro di San Gennaro is a museum of religious relics in Naples, in Campania in southern Italy. 

It was opened in December 2003.

The collection includes a large numbers of ex votos as well as silver and gold objects, paintings, bronze busts and an eighteenth-century gilded litter which was formerly used to carry the effigy of the saint in processions.

References

Further reading 

 A. Bellucci - Memorie storiche e artistiche del Tesoro nella cattedrale dal sec. XVI al XVIII - Napoli, 1915
 F. Strazzullo - Guida del Tesoro di San Gennaro - Napoli, 1966
 F. Strazzullo - La Real Cappella del Tesoro di San Gennaro - Napoli, 1978
 P.Iorio - F.Recanatesi Museo del tesoro di San Gennaro - Gli Argenti - Napoli, 2003
 P.Iorio - F.Recanatesi Museo del tesoro di San Gennaro - I Gioielli - Napoli, 2007
 P.Iorio - F.Recanatesi Le 10 Meraviglie del Tesoro di San Gennaro - Roma, Poligrafico dello Stato 2010
 P. Jorio, C. Paolillo, Il tesoro di Napoli. Capolavori del Museo di San Gennaro, Skira ed. 2013

Museums in Naples
Museums established in 2003
2003 establishments in Italy
Decorative arts museums in Italy
Jewellery museums